Princess Dowager Zhang (張太后, personal name unknown) was a princess dowager of the Chinese state Northern Yan.  Her son was Feng Ba (Emperor Wencheng).

When Feng Ba took the throne in 409 after the death of Gao Yun (Emperor Huiyi), he took the title "Heavenly Prince" (Tian Wang), but whereas most owners of that title during the Sixteen Kingdoms Period treated themselves and were treated as emperors in all respects, including honoring their mothers as empress dowagers, Feng Ba only gave her the title of princess dowager.  No further historical reference was made to her.

Northern Yan people
Sixteen Kingdoms nobility
Year of birth missing
Year of death missing